Melanie Camp is an Australian-born media professional based in Houston, Texas. One of five children, she grew up in Perth, Western Australia.

Career
Camp was a reporter for AM Buffalo, a weekday morning program on WKBW-TV, until longtime host Linda Pellegrino retired in December 2020. After that, Camp started hosting the show.

Prior to moving to Western New York, she worked as a digital reporter and managing editor for local newspaper Yo! Venice, a print and online news source for the Venice Beach community in Venice, Los Angeles.  She also worked as a host for Civilized.Life and as a host on "BattlecamLive", a two-hour, live, interactive show broadcast on Dish Network and online at Battlecam.com

Camp got her start in media in outback Australia at the regional radio station Power FM 98.1, based in Muswellbrook, New South Wales. Here she worked as the station copywriter, commercial producer, and afternoon DJ.

She has worked consistently in both radio and television ever since.

For over five seasons she was a regular on Home in WA,  on the Seven Network in Perth, Western Australia, and hosted many TV specials for the station, including the game show Finders Keepers and the Our WA travel specials.

As a radio DJ, Camp worked for DMG's Nova 937, Austereo's 2Day FM, 96FM, and 92.9FM, where she was host of the late-night Australia's Most Wanted countdown.

Camp had a small role in the HBO series True Blood Ep 503 "Whatever I Am, You Made Me". She was in the feature "Sincerely Forever" and the gangster spoof "Hit Team".

She is a member of the fake band TigerTripp. Their single "The Ice Cream Song" was released in October 2014 and the music video had over 70,000 views on YouTube.

In May 2022, Camp left Buffalo to join KPRC-TV in Houston as a correspondent for Houston Life.

References 

1984 births
Living people
People from Perth, Western Australia
21st-century Australian actresses
Australian radio presenters
Actresses from Los Angeles
Australian women radio presenters
Australian women television presenters
Australian television presenters
Digital reporters